Ritham Madubun (1 April 1971 – 1 August 2013) was an Indonesian football defender who played for Indonesia in the 1996 Asian Cup. He also played for Persipura Jayapura, PSM Makassar, Persikota Tangerang, Persija Jakarta, Pelita Jaya FC, PSPS Pekanbaru, Persma Manado.

References 

Indonesian footballers
Indonesia international footballers
1971 births
Association football defenders
2013 deaths
Persipura Jayapura players
PSM Makassar players
Persikota Tangerang players
Persija Jakarta players
Pelita Jaya FC players
PSPS Pekanbaru players
Persma Manado players
Persitara Jakarta Utara players
Indonesian Premier Division players
Perserikatan players
Sportspeople from Maluku (province)